Nam Som is a district (amphoe) in the northwestern part of Udon Thani province, northeastern Thailand.

Geography
Neighboring districts are (from the north clockwise) Na Yung, Ban Phue of Udon Thani Province, Suwannakhuha of Nong Bua Lamphu province, and Pak Chom of Loei province. Na Yung-Nam Som National Park lies within the district's boundaries.

History
The minor district (king amphoe) was created on 12 May 1969, when the two tambons Nam Som and Na Yung were split off from Ban Phue district. The third tambon Nong Waeng was added on 4 July 1969. The minor district was upgraded to a full district on 1 April 1974.

Administration
The district is divided into seven sub-districts (tambons), which are further subdivided into 80 villages (mubans). There are two townships (thesaban tambons). Na Ngua covers parts of tambons Na Ngua and Si Samran; Nam Som cover parts of tambons Nam Som and Si Samran. There are a further seven tambon administrative organizations (TAO).

Missing numbers are tambon which now form Na Yung District.

References

External links
amphoe.com
Na Yung - Nam Som National Park

Nam Som